Buey Arriba is a municipality and town in the Granma Province of Cuba.

Demographics
In 2004, the municipality of Buey Arriba had a population of 31,327.

See also
Municipalities of Cuba
List of cities in Cuba

References

External links

Populated places in Granma Province